Fiorella Migliore Llanes (born 27 January 1989 in Asunción) is a Paraguayan model, beauty queen, actress and television presenter. She is of Italian origins, because her father was born in Comiso (Sicily).

Data

Fiorella was crowned Miss Italia Paraguay in 2008 and Miss World Paraguay in 2012. She has been awarded the "Foglio d'Oro" Prize by the monthly newspaper Il Foglio Italiano. In advertising she has been the face of perfume brands such as Sweet Care and Pulp refreshments.

In Italy she started her actress career in the TV series "Don Matteo", "La Ladra" and “Sotto il cielo di Roma” (directed by Canadian Christian Duguay with James Cromwell as the Pope Pius XII).

In 2010, Migliore starred in the film Universo servilleta, and in 2012 appeared in Libertad, la lucha por la independencia, opposite Lourdes Llanes, Joaquín Serrano, Bruno Sosa Bofinger and Rafael Alfaro.

Also in 2012 she appeared on the third episode of the twentieth season of the popular American reality show The Amazing Race, when it was filmed in Asunción, and greeted the competing teams at the leg's "Pit Stop".

See also

 Italo-paraguayans
 Miss World 2012

References

External links
 
 
 

Paraguayan television actresses
1989 births
Living people
Paraguayan people of Italian descent
People from Asunción
21st-century Paraguayan actresses
Miss World 2012 delegates